Leave It to Psmith is a comic novel by English author P. G. Wodehouse, first published in the United Kingdom on 30 November 1923 by Herbert Jenkins, London, England, and in the United States on 14 March 1924 by George H. Doran, New York. It had previously been serialised, in the Saturday Evening Post in the US between 3 February and 24 March 1923, and in the Grand Magazine in the UK between April and December that year; the ending of this magazine version was rewritten for the book form.

It was the fourth and final novel featuring Psmith, the others being Mike (1909) (later republished in two parts, with Psmith appearing in the second, Mike and Psmith (1953)), Psmith in the City (1910), and Psmith, Journalist (1915) – in his introduction to the omnibus The World of Psmith, Wodehouse said that he had stopped writing about the character because he couldn't think of any more stories. It was also the second novel set at Blandings Castle, the first being Something Fresh (1915). The Blandings saga would be continued in many more novels and shorts.

The book is dedicated to his step-daughter Leonora Wodehouse, referred to as "Queen of her species".

Plot introduction
Although the main character is Psmith (here called Ronald Eustace rather than Rupert as in previous books, possibly to differentiate him from Rupert Baxter), the bulk of the story takes place at Blandings Castle and involves various intrigues within the extended family of Lord Emsworth, the absent-minded elderly Earl.

The plot is a typical Wodehouse romance, with Psmith inveigling himself into the idyllic castle, where there are the usual crop of girls to woo, crooks to foil, imposters to unmask, haughty aunts to baffle and valuable necklaces to steal. Among the players is Psmith's good friend Mike, married to Phyllis and in dire need of some financial help; the ever-suspicious Rupert Baxter is on watch as usual.

The item which the plot revolves around is the necklace (nearly all Blandings plots revolve around an item which needs to be recovered).

Plot summary

Down at Blandings, Lord Emsworth is dismayed to hear from Baxter that he is expected to travel to London to collect the poet Ralston McTodd, invited to the castle by his sister Connie, a keen supporter of the Arts; another poet, Aileen Peavey, is already installed at the castle.

Joe Keeble tries to persuade his imperious wife to let him give money to his beloved stepdaughter Phyllis, but is bullied out of it, and when Emsworth's feckless younger son Freddie suggests stealing Connie's necklace to free up some cash, Keeble is taken with the idea. Freddie, not keen on doing the job himself, sees Psmith's advert in the paper, and tags along to London with Lord Emsworth.

Meanwhile, in the metropolis, we learn that Mike, having married Phyllis on the assumption that his job as estate manager for Psmith's father would be secure, found on Mr Smith's death that the old man was bankrupt, and is working as a poorly paid schoolmaster. Psmith worked for a time for an uncle in the fish business, but could stand the fish no longer and quit.

Phyllis meets some old school friends, including Eve Halliday, an assertive young girl who pities the once-rich Phyllis, believing her too soft to cope with penury. Eve, we learn, is a friend of Freddie Threepwood, and on his encouragement has taken a post cataloguing the Blandings library, while another friend, Cynthia, has been abandoned by her husband, famous poet Ralston McTodd.

Later, Psmith sees Eve sheltering from the rain opposite the Drones, and chivalrously runs out to give her the best umbrella from the club's umbrella rack. They later meet once more at an employment agency, where Psmith has come seeking work and Eve is visiting an old friend. Psmith meets up with Freddie Threepwood, who describes his scheme to steal Connie's necklace, but dashes off without revealing his name.

Soon after, Psmith runs into Lord Emsworth at the Senior Conservative Club, where the Earl is dining with Ralston McTodd. The poet is annoyed by Emsworth's absent-mindedness, especially when the old man potters across the street to inspect a flower shop, and leaves in a rage. When Emsworth returns, he mistakes Psmith for his guest, and when Psmith sees Eve Halliday meeting Lord Emsworth, he decides to visit Blandings, posing as McTodd.

Welcomed at the castle, especially by fellow poet Peavey, he is nevertheless suspected by the ever-vigilant Baxter, the real McTodd having telegrammed to cancel his visit. Eve arrives and Psmith begins his wooing with some success, despite her belief that he is McTodd and has jilted her friend. Freddie, worried that one of the maids is a detective, is advised by Psmith to kiss her, and judge by her response whether she is a real maid; Psmith and Eve run into him just as he is embracing the girl.

One day, a stranger arrives at the house claiming to be McTodd, but Psmith turns him politely away. The man, Edward Cootes, runs into Aileen Peavey on his way back to the station, and we learn they are both crooks, estranged lovers both after the diamonds. Cootes returns to the castle, and forces Psmith to help him get in, which Psmith does, passing him off as his valet. He arranges the use of a small cottage, in case he needs to hide the jewels from Cootes.

Cootes and Peavey make a plan to steal the necklace during a poetry-reading, while Eve, having heard from Freddie that Joe Keeble plans to give him money, questions Keeble about why he isn't helping out her friend; he enlists her as a helper in the diamond-stealing plot. As Psmith begins his reading of McTodd's poems, Cootes turns off the lights and Peavey grabs the necklace, flinging it out of the window to where Eve is standing; she hides it in a flowerpot. Returning later to fetch it, she wakes the vigilant Baxter, but evades him, leaving him locked out and stashing her flowerpot on a windowsill.

Baxter, locked out of the house in his lemon-coloured pyjamas, throws flowerpots through a window to awake Lord Emsworth, who assumes he is mad and calls in Psmith to help appease him. Next morning, Baxter is fired from his job, and Eve finds the flowerpot empty at Psmith's cottage. Enlisting Freddie's help, she searches the place, but finds nothing; Psmith enters and explains his motives, his friendship with Mike and Phyllis. Cootes and Peavey appear, armed, and threaten to escape with the necklace, but Psmith takes advantage of Freddie's leg falling through the ceiling to overpower Cootes and retrieve the jewels.

Keeble gives Mike the funds he requires to buy his farm, and gives Freddie enough to get him into a bookmaking business. Psmith and Eve get engaged, and Psmith persuades Lord Emsworth to take him on as Baxter's replacement.

Characters

 Clarence Threepwood, 9th Earl of Emsworth, master of Blandings
 Hon. Freddie Threepwood, his younger son
 Lady Constance Keeble, Emsworth's imperious sister
 Joseph Keeble, Connie's husband.
 Phyllis Jackson, Joe Keeble's stepdaughter
 Michael "Mike" Jackson, her husband
 Rupert Baxter, Lord Emsworth's very efficient secretary
 Sebastian Beach, head butler at the castle
 Eve Halliday, hired to catalogue the library, an old friend of Phyllis
 Ronald Psmith, an adventurer who falls for Eve, an old friend of Mike
 Ralston McTodd, a Canadian poet invited to the castle
 Cynthia, his wife, an old friend of Eve and Phyllis
 Ada Clarkson, an old teacher of Eve and Phyllis, now running an employment agency
 Aileen Peavey (a.k.a. Smooth Lizzie), an American poet
 Edward Cootes, a card-sharp, in love with Aileen Peavey

Style

Wodehouse uses vivid, exaggerated imagery in similes and metaphors for comic effect. For example, in chapter 7.11: "A sound like two or three pigs feeding rather noisily in the middle of a thunderstorm interrupted his meditation".

Wodehouse often uses literary references, sometimes giving the quoted passage directly with little change to the original quote, but adding to the quote to make it absurdly apposite to the situation. This occurs in chapter 11.5, after Baxter sees Psmith on the terrace of Blandings Castle:

"Oh, it's you?" he said morosely.
"I in person," said Psmith genially. "Awake, beloved! Awake, for morning in the bowl of night has flung the stone that puts the stars to flight; and lo! the hunter of the East has caught the Sultan's turret in the noose of light. The Sultan himself," he added, "you will find behind yonder window, speculating idly on your motives for bunging flower-pots at him."

Descriptions provided in Wodehouse's stories generally contain humorous elements, inserted into what would otherwise be pure exposition. For example, there are comic elements in the description of Aileen Peavy provided in chapter 10. To quote part of the passage: "She [Aileen Peavey] was alone. It is a sad but indisputable fact that in this imperfect world Genius is too often condemned to walk alone—if the earthier members of the community see it coming and have time to duck".

Injuries in Wodehouse's stories generally do much less harm than would normally be expected in real life, being similar to the inconsequential injuries depicted in stage comedies. For instance, after Psmith wakes up Freddie Threepwood by arranging for Freddie's suitcase to fall on him, Freddie merely massages the stricken spot, gurgles wordlessly, and is soon ready to resume normal conversation.

One of the prime sources of humour in Wodehouse's comic novels are the distinctive or absurd names given to characters, places, and brands of goods. One notable example is Psmith, who chooses to spell his name with a silent p "as in pshrimp" (chapter 5).

Background

One reason the novel was written was because Wodehouse's adopted daughter Leonora wanted him to write another Psmith story. The book has the dedication: "To my daughter Leonora, queen of her species."

Publication history
The story was illustrated by May Wilson Preston in The Saturday Evening Post. The illustrator for the Grand serial is not stated, but the artist's signature, visible on some of the illustrations such as the first two in the first part and one in the fifth part, is the same as one used by A. Wallis Mills. Mills's signature can also be seen on the illustrations for one of the other Wodehouse books serialised in The Grand Magazine, The Adventures of Sally.

The complete novel was included in the 1932 collection Nothing But Wodehouse. It was also featured in the 1974 collection The World of Psmith.

Adaptations
The story was adapted into a play, also titled Leave It to Psmith, by Wodehouse and Ian Hay. It opened at the Shaftesbury Theatre in London on 29 September 1930 and ran for 156 performances.

The film Leave It to Me (1933) was adapted from the 1930 play based on the novel.

A radio drama based on the novel was broadcast on BBC Radio 4 in October 1981. Dramatised by Michael Bakewell, it features John Gielgud narrating as P.G. Wodehouse, Michael Hordern as Lord Emsworth, Joan Greenwood as Lady Constance, Simon Ward as Psmith, and Caroline Langrishe as Eve.

A 1988 Indian television ten-episode serial titled Isi Bahane (On This Excuse) was based on the novel and aired on DD National. The serial was produced by Doordarshan.

The novel was dramatised for radio by Archie Scottney, with Martin Jarvis as Lord Emsworth, Patricia Hodge as Constance, Edward Bennett as Psmith, and Susannah Fielding as Eve. The adaptation aired on BBC Radio 4 in May 2020.

See also 
 A full list of the Blandings stories.

References
Notes

Sources

External links 
 
 
 
 The Russian Wodehouse Society's page, with photos of book covers and a list of characters
 Fantastic Fiction's page, with details of published editions, photos of book covers and links to used copies
 A "Five Best" of comic novels, including Leave it to Psmith, from OpinionJournal.com
 Details of the play, from theatrical publishers Samuel French

Novels by P. G. Wodehouse
1923 British novels
British comedy novels
Works originally published in The Saturday Evening Post
Novels first published in serial form
Herbert Jenkins books